The Transavia PL-12 Airtruk is a single-engine agricultural aircraft designed and built by the Transavia Corporation in Australia. The Airtruk is a shoulder-wing strut braced sesquiplane of all-metal construction, with the cockpit mounted above a tractor-location opposed-cylinder air-cooled engine and short pod fuselage with rear door. The engine cowling, rear fuselage and top decking are of fibreglass. It has a tricycle undercarriage, the main units of which are carried on the lower sesquiplane wings. It has twin tail booms with two unconnected tails.  Its first flight was on 22 April 1965, and was certified on 10 February 1966.

A Transavia PL-12 featured in the 1985 movie Mad Max, Beyond Thunderdome

Design and development

It was developed from the Bennett Airtruck designed in New Zealand by Luigi Pellarini. It has a 1 tonne capacity hopper and is able to ferry two passengers as a topdresser. Other versions  can be used as cargo, ambulance or aerial survey aircraft, and carry one passenger in the top deck and four in the lower deck.

The Airtruk is also sometimes known as the Airtruck.  Because the name "Airtruck" was registered by the New Zealand companies Bennett Aviation Ltd and Waitomo Aircraft Ltd, for their PL-11, Transavia found another name for their PL-12 ("Airtruk").

July 1978 saw the first flight of an improved model, the T-300 Skyfarmer, which was powered by a Textron Lycoming IO-540-engine.  This was followed in 1981 by the T-300A with improved aerodynamics.  Transavia ceased production of the T-300 in 1985.

In 1982 certification was undertaken to enable sales in the North American market. Assistance was provided by the Aeronautical Research Laboratories (ARL) of the Defence Science and Technology Organisation (DSTO) and extensive tests carried out on the ground and in subsequent flight flutter clearance trials. ref. DSTO Structures Tech. Memo. 341

In 1985 an extended version was produced and released as the T-400. Other minor changes were made to the aerodynamics. Flutter clearance tests were again carried out by ARL and manufacture proceeded.

An isolated flutter incident was reported in 1986 involving violent oscillations of the rudder and tail boom on the T-400 during a delivery flight. Investigations were carried out by ARL and a split mass balance arm was fitted to each rudder. Prior to this the aircraft had relied on frictional damping provided by the lengthy control cables. The modified aircraft was tested both on the ground, and in flight trials in March 1988 over Port Philip near Melbourne, Australia. All attempts to induce the oscillations showed that there was no indication of a mode of vibration becoming unstable. Oscillations were induced with an air operated tool fitted with an out-of-balance rotating mass. This device had a rotational speed from 18 Hz down to zero for each charge of the compressed air cylinder.

At least 120 had been built by 1988.

Operations and survivors

As of 2008, there are at least three examples in museums in New Zealand, with an additional one being restored to airworthy status.  The second prototype is preserved in the Powerhouse Museum collection, Sydney, Australia.

There is one Transavia PL-12 Airtruk on display and under restoration at the Danish Air Museum at Stauning Vestjylland Airport in western Denmark.

There is one airworthy Airtruk in Ecka airfield near Zrenjanin, Serbia, two airworthy T300A models in Albury( Hazair PL)Australia and one airworthy PL12 model in Tooma, Australia. 

There is one airworthy and flying frequently (most weeks) at Temora Airport, New South Wales Australia

There is one located in the Bathurst Aerodrome, New South Wales Australia.

There is one located at the Queensland Air Museum, Caloundra, Queensland Australia.

There is one located at the Museum of Aeronautics and Astronautics, Cuatro Vientos (Madrid) Spain.

Variants

 PL-12 Airtruk 
 Single-engined agricultural aircraft. Powered by 300 hp (224 kW) Rolls-Royce Continental IO-520-D 
 PL-12U
 Multi-purpose utility transport, air ambulance, aerial survey aircraft.
 T-320 Airtruk
 Powered by a 320-hp Continental/Rolls-Royce Tiara 6-320-2B piston engine.
 Skyfarmer T-300 
 Powered by Lycoming O-540 engine.
 Skyfarmer T-300A 
 Improved version of the T-300.
 Skyfarmer T-400
 Enlarged, more powerful (400 hp (298 kW) Lycoming O-720 engine.
 PL-12 MIL
 Proposed multi-role utility transport, air ambulance, forward air control, light attack, counter-insurgency aircraft. Also known as the M-300.
 PL-12 550T
 Proposed variant powered by a 550-hp Pratt & Whitney Canada PT6A turboprop engine.

Specifications (PL-12 / PL-12U)

References

Notes

Bibliography
Donald, David (editor). The Encyclopedia of World Aircraft. Leicester, UK: Blitz, 1997. .
Taylor, John W R. (editor). Jane's All the Worlds Aircraft 1976-77. London:Jane's Yearbooks, 1976. .
Taylor, John W R. (editor). Jane's All the Worlds Aircraft 1988-89. Coulsdon, Surrey, UK:  Jane's Information Group, 1988. .

External links

 Transavia PL-12 Airtruk, kiwiaircraftimages.com
 Airtruk Capability, Transfeild Promotional Video
 The First Airtruks, Transfeild Promotional Video

1960s Australian agricultural aircraft
Twin-boom aircraft
Sesquiplanes
Shoulder-wing aircraft
Single-engined tractor aircraft
Aircraft first flown in 1965